Mahlon Dickerson (April 17, 1770 – October 5, 1853) was a justice of the Supreme Court of New Jersey, the seventh governor of New Jersey, United States Senator from New Jersey, the 10th United States Secretary of the Navy and a United States district judge of the United States District Court for the District of New Jersey.

Early life

Dickerson was born on April 17, 1770, in Hanover Neck, Province of New Jersey, British America.  He was the brother of Philemon Dickerson, a United States representative from New Jersey and Mahlon Dickerson's successor on the United States District Court for the District of New Jersey.
 
Dickerson was educated by private tutors, received an Artium Baccalaureus degree in 1789 from the College of New Jersey (now Princeton University) and read law in 1793.

Career

He was admitted to the bar and entered private practice in Morristown, from 1793 to 1794, and from 1794 to 1796. He was a private in the New Jersey Detached Militia, Second Regiment of Cavalry in 1794, during the Whiskey Rebellion. He continued private practice in Philadelphia, Pennsylvania from 1797 to 1810. He was a miner and iron manufacturer in Morris County, New Jersey from 1810 to 1853. He served as a Judge of the Mayor's Court in Philadelphia. He was a member of the Philadelphia Common Council in 1799. He was a commissioner of bankruptcy for the Commonwealth of Pennsylvania in 1802. He was Adjutant-general for Pennsylvania from 1805 to 1808. He was city recorder for Philadelphia from 1808 to 1810. He was a member of the New Jersey General Assembly from 1811 to 1813. He was a justice of the Supreme Court of New Jersey from 1813 to 1815. He was reporter for the Supreme Court of New Jersey from 1813 to 1814. He was the 7th Governor of New Jersey from 1815 to 1817.

Congressional service

Dickerson was elected as a Democratic-Republican (later Crawford Republican and Jacksonian Democrat) from New Jersey to the United States Senate in 1816. He was reelected in 1823 and served from March 4, 1817, to January 30, 1829, when he resigned. He was immediately reelected to fill the vacancy caused by the resignation of United States Senator Ephraim Bateman and served from January 30, 1829, to March 3, 1833. He was Chairman of the United States Senate Committee on the Library for the 15th United States Congress, Chairman of the United States Senate Committee on Commerce and Manufactures for the 16th through the 18th United States Congresses and Chairman of the United States Senate Committee on Manufactures for the 19th through the 22nd United States Congresses.

Later career

Dickerson was vice-president of the New Jersey Legislative Council in 1833. President Andrew Jackson initially appointed him as minister to Russia which Dickerson had accepted only to find out upon his arrival to Washington D.C. that Jackson instead decided to make him the 10th United States Secretary of the Navy in 1834. He was re-appointed by President Martin Van Buren and served from June 1834 to June 1838.

Dickerson was a delegate to the New Jersey Constitutional Convention in 1844.

Federal judicial service

Dickerson was nominated by President Martin Van Buren on July 14, 1840, to a seat on the United States District Court for the District of New Jersey vacated by Judge William Rossell. He was confirmed by the United States Senate on July 21, 1840, and received his commission on July 23, 1840. His service terminated on February 16, 1841, due to his resignation.

Personal life

He died on October 5, 1853, in Succasunna, Morris County, New Jersey. He was interred in Presbyterian Cemetery in Succasunna.

Societies

In 1807, Dickerson was elected a member of the American Philosophical Society. During the 1820s, he was a member of the prestigious society, Columbian Institute for the Promotion of Arts and Sciences, who counted among their members former presidents Andrew Jackson and John Quincy Adams and many prominent men of the day, including well-known representatives of the military, government service, medical and other professions. In 1833, he was admitted to the Society of the Cincinnati in the State of New Jersey.

Legacy

Mahlon Dickerson Reservation in Morris County is named after him.

References

Sources

External links

 Biography of Mahlon Dickerson, New Jersey State Library
 New Jersey Governor Mahlon Dickerson, National Governors Association
 Article at "Discovering Lewis & Clark"
 Biography of Mahlon Dickerson from The Political Graveyard
 
 Mahlon Dickerson Reservation, a 3,200-acre Morris County, New Jersey public park

1770 births
1853 deaths
People from Hanover Township, New Jersey
People of colonial New Jersey
American Episcopalians
United States Secretaries of the Navy
Jackson administration cabinet members
Van Buren administration cabinet members
Democratic-Republican Party United States senators from New Jersey
Jacksonian United States senators from New Jersey
New Jersey Democratic-Republicans
New Jersey Jacksonians
Governors of New Jersey
Democratic-Republican Party state governors of the United States
Members of the New Jersey Legislative Council
Members of the New Jersey General Assembly
Philadelphia City Council members
Judges of the United States District Court for the District of New Jersey
United States federal judges appointed by Martin Van Buren
Justices of the Supreme Court of New Jersey
United States federal judges admitted to the practice of law by reading law
19th-century American judges
Princeton University alumni
People of the Whiskey Rebellion
United States Army soldiers
Burials in New Jersey
19th-century American lawyers
19th-century American politicians